Pietro Pappagallo (Terlizzi (Bari) June 28, 1888 – Rome, March 24, 1944) was a Catholic priest and an Italian anti-fascist who assisted victims of Nazism and Fascism in Rome during World War II.

Biography
After coming to Rome in 1925, Don Pappagallo was a member of the College of Beneficed Clergy of the Basilica of Santa Maria Maggiore and chaplain to the Sisters of the Child Jesus on the Via Urbana. He was also assistant pastor of the Basilica of St. John Lateran and had served as secretary to Cardinal Bonaventura Cerretti, the Archpriest of Santa Maria Maggiore.

During the German occupation of Rome, which lasted from September 1943 to June 1944, Pappagallo helped soldiers, partisans, allies, Jews and others wanted by the regime. Betrayed by a German spy Gino Crescentini, Pappagallo was arrested on January 29, 1944 by the SS, as part of a campaign against the Roman resistance. Witnesses reported that Pappagallo shared his meals with fellow prisoners who had not received food. Sentenced to death, he was executed on March 24, 1944 at the Ardeatine Caves.

Recognition
Pope John Paul II in Jubilee year of 2000 included Pietro Pappagallo among the Church's twentieth-century martyrs. 
On July 13, 1998 the President of the Italian Republic Carlo Azeglio Ciampi awarded Pappagallo posthumously the Medaglia d'oro al merito civile (Gold medal for civil merit), whose citation stated: "As a priest of the Diocese of Rome, during the German occupation he worked zealously in the clandestine struggle and gave himself generously to aid Jews, deserters, anti-fascists, and allies in flight, helping them hide and refresh themselves. Betrayed, he was handed over to the Germans, sacrificing his life with serenity of soul, a sign of the faith that had always lighted his way."

Bibliography
Paolo Vallarelli Dove giocano gli Angeli Surico Editore Modugno: Bari 2009.

Filmography
 Roberto Rossellini's seminal neorealist film Rome, Open City (1945) portrayed Don Pietro Pappagallo in the character of Don Pietro Pellegrini, played by Aldo Fabrizi.
A 2006 RAI television drama La buona battaglia:Don Pietro Pappagallo dramatized his story directly. Pappagallo was played by Flavio Insinna.

1888 births
1944 deaths
People from Terlizzi
20th-century Italian Roman Catholic priests
Italian resistance movement members
People murdered in Italy
Italian murder victims
Fosse Ardeatine massacre victims
Resistance members killed by Nazi Germany